Ashrita Furman (born Keith Furman, September 16, 1954) is a Guinness World Records record-breaker. As of 2017, Furman has set more than 600 official Guinness Records and currently holds 530 records, thus holding the Guinness world record for the most Guinness world records. He has been breaking records since 1979.

Life and records

Early life
Furman was born in 1954 in Brooklyn, New York. He was fascinated with the Guinness Book of World Records as a child but never thought he could ever break a record since he was very unathletic.

As a teenager, he became interested in spirituality and in 1970 became a devout follower of the spiritual leader Sri Chinmoy.

Sri Chinmoy inspired Furman to participate in a 24-hour bicycle race in New York City's Central Park in 1978. With only two weeks' training, Furman tied for third place, cycling . Around this time, he changed his first name to Ashrita ("protected by God" in Sanskrit).

First record
In 1979, Furman set his first official record by doing 27,000 jumping jacks. In 1986, Furman invented and set the record for underwater pogo stick jumping and introduced it on Good Morning America on April Fools' Day.

Records around the world
Furman has managed a health food store in Jamaica, Queens, New York, since 1982. He is also a tour manager for his meditation group and is therefore able to travel extensively. As of 2014, Furman has set records in 40 countries. He completed his goal of breaking a record in all seven continents when he set the mile hula hoop record at Uluru (also known as Ayers Rock) in the Australian desert in 2003. Furman has also set records at such famous landmarks as the Egyptian pyramids (distance pool cue balancing), Stonehenge (standing on a Swiss ball), the Eiffel Tower (most sit-ups in an hour), the Great Wall of China (hopping on a kangaroo ball), Borobudur (fastest time to run a mile while balancing a milk bottle on the head) and Angkor Wat (jumping rope on a pogo stick). While in China, Furman broke the record for running 8 km (4.97 mi) on stilts in the fastest time (39 min. 56 sec.), a record which had stood since 1982.

Creating new records
Furman has also been a pioneer in setting records in several new activities including landrowing. Using a converted indoor rower with wheels and brakes, Furman rowed  in 16 days in Bali in 1991. Furman also developed the sport of gluggling, underwater juggling, which he did for 48 minutes at Kelly Tarlton's Antarctic Encounter and Underwater World in Auckland, New Zealand in 2002 and distance sack racing, which Furman did for a mile while racing against a yak in Mongolia in 2007. The pencil was built in three weeks as a birthday gift for teacher Sri Chinmoy on 27 August 2007. Longer than the  pencil outside the Malaysia HQ of stationers Faber-Castell, it was transported from Queens, New York, to the City Museum in St. Louis. In April 2009 Furman became the first person to hold 100 Guinness World Records at once.

See also
 Impossibility Challenger

References

Further reading

External links

 Official website
 Ashrita's life story (video)
 Interview with Ashrita Furman (video)
 

1954 births
People from Brooklyn
People from Queens, New York
Devotees of Sri Chinmoy
Living people
Jugglers
Jewish American sportspeople
Guinness World Records